The Meridian Rock is set at the Port of Tema, Ghana, on the platform of Meridian Port Services Limited (MPS). It is a rock marking the line of the Greenwich Meridian.

Description 
The prime Meridian Line (0°00’00.00”E/W) passes through the center of Meridian Port Services Container Terminal, the line first enters MPS from the northern boundary (5°37’35.15”N) to the beach side (5°37’29.75”N) which is the closest land-based place to the point where the Greenwich Meridian Line (zero degrees longitude) crosses with the Equator (zero degrees latitude).

The monument was erected by The Board of Directors, Management and Workers of Meridian Port Services Limited and unveiled by President John Dramani Mahama on 21 March 2014.

References

Tema
Monuments and memorials in Ghana